Alisa Kleybanova and Anastasia Pavlyuchenkova were the defending champions but Kleybanova did not compete in the Juniors this year.

Pavlyuchenkova and Urszula Radwańska defeated Misaki Doi and Kurumi Nara in the final, 6–4, 2–6, [10–7] to win the girls' doubles tennis title at the 2007 Wimbledon Championships.

Seeds

  Anastasia Pavlyuchenkova /  Urszula Radwańska (champions)
  Ksenia Milevskaya /  Ksenia Pervak (first round)
  Ksenia Lykina /  Anastasia Pivovarova (first round, withdrew)
  Irina-Camelia Begu /  Oksana Kalashnikova (semifinals)
  Julia Glushko /  Dominice Ripoll (first round, withdrew)
  Tyra Calderwood /  Elena Chernyakova (second round)
  Lenka Juríková /  Kristína Kučová (quarterfinals)
  Jessica Moore /  Zhou Yimiao (quarterfinals)

Draw

Finals

Top half

Bottom half

References

External links

Girls' Doubles
Wimbledon Championship by year – Girls' doubles